The term Wooded Carpathians refers to a group of mountain ranges that constitute the central section of Eastern Carpathians, covering both inner and outer regions of that section. Geographical scope of the term varies, since it is often used in broader or narrower sense, according to different classifications and terminological conventions. It is traditionally and most commonly applied to a wider group of mountain ranges that encompasses all mountains within central section of Outer Eastern Carpathians, including Eastern Beskids with Polonynian Beskids, and also all mountains within northern section of Inner Eastern Carpathians, including Vihorlat-Gutin Area and Maramureș-Rodna Area. In that sense, Wooded Carpathians are stretching from the southeastern corner of Poland and far eastern corner of Slovakia, through western parts of Ukraine, encompassing all of the Ukrainian Carpathians, and continuing into the northern region of Romania.

The term Wooded Carpathians should not be confused with partially overlapping terms like Ukrainian Carpathians, Eastern Beskids or Wooded Beskids, that are defined by different criteria.

Subdivisions 

In wider sense, Wooded Carpathians include:

 central section of Outer Eastern Carpathians, including Eastern Beskids with Polonynian Beskids
 northern section of Inner Eastern Carpathians, including Vihorlat-Gutin Area and Maramureș-Rodna Area

See also

References

Sources

 
 Ilie Gherhes, "Romanian Human Habitat and Atypical Volohs' Living in the Wooded Carpathians (Ukraine)", Journal of Settlements and Spatial Planning, 4/2 (2013), pp. 341–345. 
 Michael Schneeberger, Frank-Michael Lange, Die rumänischen Waldkarpaten: Maramureş, Vişeu de Sus und ein Abstecher in die Bukowina, Schelzky und Jeep 1998.
 Filip Świstuń, Galicyjskie Beskidy i Karpaty Lesiste: Zarys orograficzn, Rzeszow 1876.

External links

 Encyclopedia of Ukraine: Beskyds
 Encyclopedia of Ukraine: High Beskyd
 Encyclopedia of Ukraine: Middle Beskyd
 Encyclopedia of Ukraine: Low Beskyd
 Encyclopedia of Ukraine: Polonynian Beskyd
 Encyclopedia of Ukraine: Volcanic Ukrainian Carpathians
 Encyclopedia of Ukraine: Inner Carpathian Valley
 Encyclopedia of Ukraine: Maramureş Basin
 Encyclopedia of Ukraine: Maramureş-Bukovynian Upland
 Carpathian Mountains: Division (map)

Mountain ranges of the Eastern Carpathians
Mountain ranges of Ukraine
Mountain ranges of Poland
Mountain ranges of Slovakia
Mountain ranges of Romania